Arnd Meier (born March 1, 1973, in Hannover, Germany) is a former race car driver. After finishing second in the 1996 German Formula Three Championship behind Jarno Trulli, but ahead of teammate Nick Heidfeld, Meier participated in the 1997 and 1998 seasons of the CART World Series for Project Indy and Davis Racing. He led for two laps on his Champ Car debut in Australia, largely as the result of pit strategy. For much of his time in Champ Car, he drove the only Lola chassis in the field, at a time when Lola were struggling to match the pace of the dominant Reynard chassis. Among his 29 starts, his best finish was 10th place at Road America in 1998. In 1999, Meier returned to Europe to race in F3000 and touring cars. In 2004, Meier and René Wolff drove a BMW 318i to win the BFGoodrich Long Distance Championship.

Motorsports Career Results

American Open Wheel
(key)

CART

Series Summary

International Formula 3000
(key) (Races in bold indicate pole position) (Races in italics indicate fastest lap)

References

1973 births
Champ Car drivers
German racing drivers
German Formula Renault 2.0 drivers
German Formula Three Championship drivers
Living people
International Formula 3000 drivers
Sportspeople from Hanover
Racing drivers from Lower Saxony
24 Hours of Daytona drivers

G+M Escom Motorsport drivers
Nordic Racing drivers
Opel Team BSR drivers
Audi Sport drivers
Phoenix Racing drivers
RSM Marko drivers
Josef Kaufmann Racing drivers
Nürburgring 24 Hours drivers